Veljko Nikolić (born 29 August 1999) is a Serbian professional footballer who plays as a midfielder for Serbian club Red Star Belgrade.

Club career

OFK Beograd
Veljko started playing football with football school "Arena" and later moved to OFK Beograd, where he passed all youth categories. He was promoted in the first team for the 2016–17 Serbian First League season. Nikolić made his senior debut for OFK Beograd on 27 August 2016, playing match against ČSK Čelarevo in 3rd fixture match of the season. He had started the match on the field and was replaced in the second half by Filip Rajevac. He also played next 4 First League and a cup match against Sloboda Užice.

Red Star Belgrade
On 4 October 2016, Nikolić signed a three-year contract with Red Star Belgrade in an €80,000 transfer from OFK Beograd. The transfer initially had a clause which would have given OFK Beograd 20% of the sum of Nikolić's next transfer, but Red Star purchased the last 20% of his contract for €60,000 in February 2017. Nikolić made his debut for Red Star in a friendly match Njegoš Lovćenac on 18 October 2016. On 15 March 2019, he extended his contract with Red Star to the summer of 2023. On 20 November 2019, he made his Serbian Cup debut for Red Star in a 1-0 win against Mačva in the Round of 16.

International career
Nikolić was a member of Serbia U16 and Serbia U17 squads between 2014 and 2016. In August 2016, Nikolić was called into Serbia U19 squad for memorial tournament "Stevan Vilotić - Ćele", where he debuted in opening match against United States.

Career statistics

Club

Honours
Red Star Belgrade
 Serbian SuperLiga (3): 2019–20, 2020–21, 2021–22
 Serbian Cup (2): 2020–21, 2021–22

References

External links
 

1999 births
Living people
Footballers from Belgrade
Serbian footballers
Association football midfielders
OFK Beograd players
Red Star Belgrade footballers
Serbian First League players
Serbia youth international footballers
Serbia under-21 international footballers